Dubrovskoye Urban Settlement is the name of several municipal formations in Russia.

Dubrovskoye Urban Settlement, a municipal formation corresponding to Dubrovsky Settlement Administrative Okrug, an administrative division of Dubrovsky District of Bryansk Oblast
Dubrovskoye Urban Settlement, a municipal formation corresponding to Dubrovskoye Settlement Municipal Formation, an administrative division of Vsevolozhsky District of Leningrad Oblast

See also
Dubrovsky (disambiguation)

References

Notes

Sources

